The 1903 Nashville Garnet and Blue football team represented the University of Nashville during the 1903 Southern Intercollegiate Athletic Association football season. The team was disbanded, and then started back again.

Schedule

References

Nashville
Nashville Garnet and Blue football seasons
Nashville Garnet and Blue football